Serenade is a lost 1927 American drama silent film directed by Harry d'Abbadie d'Arrast and written by Herman J. Mankiewicz and Ernest Vajda. The film stars Adolphe Menjou, Kathryn Carver, Lawrence Grant, Lina Basquette and Martha Franklin. The film was released on December 24, 1927, by Paramount Pictures.

Plot summary

Cast 
 Adolphe Menjou as Franz Rossi
 Kathryn Carver as Gretchen
 Lawrence Grant as Josef Bruckner
 Lina Basquette as The Dancer
 Martha Franklin as Gretchen's Mother

References

External links 
 
 
 
 

1927 films
1920s English-language films
Silent American drama films
1927 drama films
Paramount Pictures films
Films set in Vienna
Films about composers
Films about classical music and musicians
American black-and-white films
Lost American films
American silent feature films
1927 lost films
Lost drama films
Films directed by Harry d'Abbadie d'Arrast
1920s American films